Boliguibia Ouattara (born 2 July 1988) is an Ivorean footballer who plays as a defender for Omani club Sur SC.

Career
During the 2011-2012 season, Ouattara made one appearance for the Russian club FK Khimki.

On 22 February 2018, Ouattara signed for Estonian Meistriliiga club Paide Linnameeskond.

References

External links

Boliguibia Ouattara at playmakerstats.com (English version of zerozero.pt)

1988 births
Living people
Ivorian footballers
Ivorian expatriate footballers
Kakkonen players
Ykkönen players
Meistriliiga players
Ekstraklasa players
Sabé Sports players
ASEC Mimosas players
Al-Arabi (Jordan) players
FC Khimki players
Al-Ramtha SC players
Al-Wehdat SC players
Korona Kielce players
Oulun Palloseura players
Kajaanin Haka players
Paide Linnameeskond players
Al-Ansar FC (Medina) players
Sur SC players
Association football defenders
Ivorian expatriate sportspeople in Russia
Ivorian expatriate sportspeople in Jordan
Ivorian expatriate sportspeople in Poland
Ivorian expatriate sportspeople in Estonia
Ivorian expatriate sportspeople in Finland
Ivorian expatriate sportspeople in Saudi Arabia
Ivorian expatriate sportspeople in Oman
Expatriate footballers in Russia
Expatriate footballers in Jordan
Expatriate footballers in Poland
Expatriate footballers in Estonia
Expatriate footballers in Finland
Expatriate footballers in Saudi Arabia
Expatriate footballers in Oman